is a passenger railway station in located in the town of Shirahama,  Nishimuro District, Wakayama Prefecture, Japan, operated by West Japan Railway Company (JR West).

Lines

Station layout
The station consists of two opposed side platforms connected to the station building by a footbridge. The station is unattended.

Platforms

Adjacent stations

|-
!colspan=5|West Japan Railway Company (JR West)

History
Kii-Tonda Station opened on December 20, 1933. With the privatization of the Japan National Railways (JNR) on April 1, 1987, the station came under the aegis of the West Japan Railway Company.

Passenger statistics
In fiscal 2019, the station was used by an average of 47 passengers daily (boarding passengers only).

Surrounding Area
Tonda River 
Shirahama Municipal Tomita Junior High School
Shirahama Municipal Minami Shirahama Elementary School

See also
List of railway stations in Japan

References

External links

 Kii-Tonda Station (West Japan Railway) 

Railway stations in Wakayama Prefecture
Railway stations in Japan opened in 1933
Shirahama, Wakayama